Yelizaveta Demirova (née Savlinis; born 14 August 1987, Gatchina) is a Russian track and field sprinter.

At the 2012 Summer Olympics, she competed in the Women's 200 metres and ran in the 4 × 100 m heats for the Russian team.

References
 
 
 Profile at RusAthletics

Living people
1987 births
People from Gatchina
Sportspeople from Leningrad Oblast
Russian female sprinters
Olympic female sprinters
Olympic athletes of Russia
Athletes (track and field) at the 2012 Summer Olympics
World Athletics Championships athletes for Russia
European Athletics Championships medalists
Russian Athletics Championships winners